Obabika Lake may refer to:

Obabika Lake (Northeastern Ontario)
Obabika Lake (Northwestern Ontario)